Newmanism is an album by saxophonist David Newman released on the Atlantic label in 1974.

Reception

Allmusic awarded the album 3 stars.

Track listing
All compositions by David Newman except as indicated
 "Baby Rae" - 6:51
 "Song for the New Man" (Pat Rebillot) - 5:00
 "Violet Don't Be Blue" (Rebillot) - 5:00
 "Foxy Brown" (Roy Ayers) - 4:59
 "Newmanism" - 5:36
 "Sweet Tears" (Ayers) - 5:26
 "Let Me Know" (Rebillot) - 5:52
 "Brandy" - 6:05

Personnel 
David Newman - soprano saxophone, tenor saxophone, flute, arranger
Roy Ayers - vibraphone
Pat Rebillot - electric piano
Ron Carter - bass, electric bass
Andrew Smith or Roy Brooks - drums
Armen Halburian - percussion
Rondo H. Slade - lyrics and words

References 

1974 albums
David "Fathead" Newman albums
Atlantic Records albums